Zayas Island is an island on the North Coast of British Columbia, Canada, located in the east side of Dixon Entrance to the west of Dundas Island. Three parcels of land on the north, east and south shores of the island are reserves of the Lax Kw'alaams First Nation.

History

Etymology
The island is named after the second pilot of Jacinto Caamaño, Juan Zayas, during the 1792 voyage of the Pacific Northwest led by the Spanish Empire.

References

Islands of British Columbia
North Coast of British Columbia
Range 5 Coast Land District